Sarah Lakay is an Australian rules footballer playing for the West Coast Eagles in the AFL Women's (AFLW). Lakay was recruited by the Eagles with the 40th pick in the 2021 AFL Women's draft.

AFL Women's career
Lakay debuted for the Eagles in the third round of the 2022 AFL Women's season. On debut, she collected 7 disposals and 10 hitouts in a loss against . Lakay earned a rising star nomination in season seven, round 5, after having an outstanding performance against  where she tallied 42 hitouts, the second-most in an AFLW match ever, while also collecting five tackles and seven disposals.

Statistics
Updated to the end of S7 (2022).

|-
| 2022 ||  || 23
| 8 || 0 || 0 || 15 || 21 || 36 || 6 || 19 || 99 || 0.0 || 0.0 || 1.9 || 2.6 || 4.5 || 0.8 || 2.4 || 12.4 || 0
|-
| S7 (2022) ||  || 23
| 10 || 0 || 0 || 32 || 35 || 67 || 10 || 41 || 248 || 0.0 || 0.0 || 3.2 || 3.5 || 6.7 || 1.0 || 4.1 || 24.8 || 
|- class=sortbottom
! colspan=3 | Career
! 18 !! 0 !! 0 !! 47 !! 56 !! 103 !! 16 !! 60 !! 347 !! 0.0 !! 0.0 !! 2.6 !! 3.1 !! 5.7 !! 0.9 !! 3.3 !! 19.3 !! 0
|}

Honours and Achievements
  record holder for hitouts in a game: 42 – S7 (2022)

References

External links
 Sarah Lakay at AustralianFootball.com

2003 births
Living people
West Coast Eagles (AFLW) players
Australian rules footballers from Western Australia